The Big Christopher is the highest award in Latvian cinema. Established in 1977, it is  given out at the Latvian National Film Festival.  
Due to different reasons, the festival has not been held in 1992, from 1994 to 1995, 1997 and 1999 and held biannually from 2001 to 2009 with no festival in 2010, 2011 and 2013. Since 2014 it was held every year again.

Past winners

Best Film Categories

Acting Categories

References

Film festivals in Latvia
Recurring events established in 1977
Film festivals in the Soviet Union
Latvian awards
1977 establishments in Latvia